Several ships of the Royal Navy have been named HMS Sussex:
 , a fourth-rate  frigate launched with either 38 or 40 guns in 1652, later rearmed to 46 guns, and blew up in 1653
 , a third-rate ship of the line that sank in the Mediterranean Sea in 1694
 , a  heavy cruiser, launched in 1928 and scrapped in 1950
  was the name of the Royal Naval Reserve unit in Brighton that closed in 1994

Royal Navy ship names